The 2015 World Taekwondo Championships were the 22nd edition of the World Taekwondo Championships, and were held in Chelyabinsk, Russia from May 12 to May 18, 2015. The decision to award the games to Russia was made in 2013 as they out-voted both Vietnam and Brazil.

Medal table

Medal summary

Men

Women

Team ranking

Men

Women

Participating nations
A total of 872 athletes from 139 nations competed.

 (10)
 (3)
 (5)
 (2)
 (5)
 (5)
 (1)
 (15)
 (2)
 (12)
 (2)
 (11)
 (6)*
 (2)
 (5)
 (16)
 (6)
 (1)
 (16)
 (3)
 (3)
 (4)
 (11)
 (16)
 (16)
 (15)
 (4)
 (2)
 (12)
 (5)
 (13)
 (3)
 (2)
 (10)
 (3)
 (5)
 (16)
 (2)
 (6)
 (16)
 (4)
 (7)
 (1)
 (13)
 (5)
 (14)
 (15)
 (1)
 (4)
 (2)
 (1)
 (4)
 (2)
 (6)
 (3)
 (3)
 (13)
 (3)
 (5)
 (7)
 (10)
 (14)
 (4)
 (6)
 (13)
 (16)
 (5)
 (2)
 (4)
 (1)
 (2)
 (3)
 (2)
 (4)
 (3)
 (7)
 (1)
 (5)
 (6)
 (8)
 (2)
 (16)
 (5)
 (1)
 (5)
 (2)
 (9)
 (2)
 (7)
 (2)
 (2)
 (5)
 (4)
 (3)
 (3)
 (2)
 (2)
 (5)
 (12)
 (11)
 (6)
 (7)
 (4)
 (2)
 (16)
 (6)
 (2)
 (3)
 (5)
 (13)
 (1)
 (2)
 (2)
 (6)
 (1)
 (3)
 (16)
 (16)
 (11)
 (6)
 (8)
 (2)
 (6)
 (8)
 (2)
 (3)
 (6)
 (16)
 (5)
 (2)
 (16)
 (2)
 (16)
 (2)
 (7)
 (9)
 (9)
 (2)
 (2)

 Athletes from Belgium competed as World Taekwondo Federation (WTF) due to the suspension of the country's Taekwondo Federation.

References

Results (Archived version)

External links
Official website

 
World Championships
Taekwondo Championships
World Taekwondo Championships
2015 in Russian sport
Sport in Chelyabinsk
Taekwondo in Russia